Peri Gilpin (born Peri Kay Oldham; May 27, 1961) is an American actress, best known for her roles as Roz Doyle in the NBC sitcom Frasier and Kim Keeler in the ABC Family drama series Make It or Break It.

Early life

Gilpin was born in Waco, Texas, as Peri Kay Oldham, daughter of James Franklin Oldham, a broadcaster who became known as Jim O'Brien, and his wife Sandra Jo Hauck.  After her parents divorced, her mother married Wes Gilpin in 1969. Gilpin then took her stepfather's surname.

Gilpin grew up in Dallas, where her family encouraged her acting abilities. After studying at the Dallas Theater Center, she pursued acting at the University of Texas at Austin and the British American Drama Academy in London.

Career
Gilpin appeared on the TV series Cheers, playing Holly Matheson in the 21st episode of the 11th season, which aired in April 1993.

From 1993 until 2004, Gilpin played Roz Doyle in the television series Frasier, a spin-off of Cheers, starring Kelsey Grammer as Frasier Crane, the role he had played on Cheers since 1984. Along with the principal cast, Gilpin won a Screen Actors Guild Award for Outstanding Performance by an Ensemble in a Comedy Series in 1999.

In 2009, Gilpin appeared in the ABC Family drama Make It or Break It, for which she received a Gracie Award in the category of "Outstanding Female Actor in a Supporting Role in a Drama Series".

Gilpin and Frasier co-star Jane Leeves ran a production company, Bristol Cities (named from the cockney rhyming slang), whose projects included a Fox network pilot titled Minister of Divine, an American remake of the British sitcom The Vicar of Dibley with Kirstie Alley (another Cheers regular) in a starring role.

Gilpin is the voice artist for the character Jane Proudfoot in Final Fantasy: The Spirits Within. She also provided the voices of Desiree in the Nickelodeon animated television series Danny Phantom, Volcana in Superman: The Animated Series and Justice League, Hecate in Hercules, and Kate Corrigan in the Hellboy animated films. Gilpin also did voice work for several Wells Fargo and Johnsonville Meats TV commercials.

Gilpin has appeared on the television series Medium and Desperate Housewives. She has a supporting role on the television series Make It or Break It and has appeared on Law and Order: Criminal Intent. She starred alongside Teri Polo in the Lifetime film For the Love of a Child. In 2012, Gilpin guest-starred with another Cheers stalwart, Ted Danson, in CSI: Crime Scene Investigation. She also had a recurring role in Men at Work on TBS as editor of Full Steam magazine. In the second season of Scorpion, she was introduced as Katherine Cooper, a team superior in homeland security.

Personal life
On July 31, 1999, Gilpin married painter Christian Vincent. The couple has twins born to a surrogate mother on May 7, 2004. 

Since her mother's death from leiomyosarcoma in 1997, Gilpin has led efforts for cancer research awareness.

Filmography

Film

Television

References

External links

Peri Gilpin Interview with Ability Magazine
Peri Gilpin at Allmovie

1961 births
American television actresses
American voice actresses
Living people
Skyline High School (Dallas) alumni
Actresses from Dallas
Actresses from Waco, Texas
University of Texas at Austin College of Fine Arts alumni
20th-century American actresses
21st-century American actresses